TFI International Inc. is a Canadian transport and logistics company based in Saint-Laurent, Quebec, a borough of Montreal.  It operates primarily in Canada, the United States, and Mexico through 4 business segments: less than truckload (LTL), package and courier, logistics, and truckload.  It has Canada's largest LTL business, largest trucking fleet, and in 2021 was ranked 6th in terms of revenue among both LTL and truckload North American carriers. Its trucking fleet consists of over 14,000 company-owned power units, nearly 10,000 owner-operator tractors, nearly 50,000 trailers and over 200 straight trucks.

Since the mid 1990s, the company's main source of growth has been complete takeovers of smaller logistics companies (over 190 between 1996 and 2021) many of which continue operating as subsidiaries.

History

Foundation and early history 

The company was founded by Reno and Réal Emond in 1957 as a regional trucking service in Cabano, Quebec. Cabano Transport expanded its operations mainly in Quebec and the Maritimes through a series of acquisitions. In 1985, Cabano Transport purchased D'Anjou Transport and changed its name to Groupe Cabano-d'Anjou.

In 1987, the company acquired Groupe Expéditex and changed its name to Cabano Expeditex Group Inc.. The purchases increased Cabano's fleet from 700 to 5,000 vehicles making it the largest trucking company in Quebec and fourth-largest in Canada. Following the acquisitions, Cabano Expeditex focused on reducing debt shutting down 15 terminals by October 1987, had plans to shutter 4 more, and expected to reduce administrative staff at the new acquisitions by about 40% and unionized workers by about 10%.

This deal added 610 rolling stock units and 300-400 employees to Cabano Expeditex's existing 2,100 employees and 3,200 vehicles. In December 1990 the company changed its name to Cabano Transportation Group.

In 1992, Cabano acquired Ontario-based Kingsway Transports Ltd. and its US operations from Kingsway's parent, Winnipeg-based Federal Industries Ltd. Following the purchase, Cabano changed its name to Cabano-Kingsway. The combined company operated 1,200 trucks, 3,400 trailers, and 63 service centers, and about 3,000 employees in eastern Canada and 19 northern US states. Cabano had been Canada's fourth largest trucking company but this deal meant it surpassed Reimer Express and TNT Canada to become the second largest after CP Express.

Strategy shift 

In 1997, Cabano Kingsway made significant management changes focused on operational efficiency and cost reductions. The company had been severely impacted by a strike in 1996 resulting in an earnings deficit. One key focus of the new management team was to reduce risk by diversifying its service offerings. Early acquisitions, therefore, were primarily intended to increase efficiency and grow new markets and services.

By following their acquisitions strategy and divesting "non-core assets," the company subsequently experienced a significant increase in revenue with a much lower increase in expenses. In 1999, it changed its name to TransForce Inc.

In February 2000, TransForce acquired TST Solutions the parent of US and Canadian LTL carrier TST Overland Express. This purchase represented a significant increase to TransForce's presence in the US. Post acquisition, TST continued to operate as an independent subsidiary.

The company made major changes to its structure in 2002 when it converted itself into an income fund known as TransForce Income Fund.

Diversification and expansion 

Also in 2002, TransForce acquired Brampton, Ontario-based parcel-delivery company Canpar Courier. Canpar provides domestic services directly and cross-border services via interline agreements with other carriers and had been established in 1976 as a division of Canadian Pacific Trucks. By the time of its acquisition, Canpar operated 53 terminals and 1,000 vehicles and had reported revenues of approximately $150 million in 2001.

Another significant purchase came in January 2004 when TransForce acquired the assets of Canadian Freightways from the recently bankrupt US trucking company, Consolidated Freightways. The deal was reported at  plus assumption of debt worth . Canadian Freightways offered LTL, truckload, warehousing, brokerage, and other logistics services. With acquisitions and organic growth, by 2005 TransForce was Canada's largest trucking company operating two dozen subsidiaries with a combined nearly 3,500 trucks and 9,000 trailers.

TransForce again expanded its courier services in October 2007 with the purchase of ICS Courier and its parent Century II Holdings Inc. Founded in 1978 as Information Communication Services, Toronto-based ICS primarily focused on commercial shipments including parcel and document services and claimed 35,000 accounts, more than 1,300 employees and owner-operators, and 35 offices.

In 2008, as part of a corporate restructuring, TransForce Income Fund changed its name back to TransForce Inc., the name it had used from 1999 to 2002.

In November 2009, Transforce acquired the Retail Solutions Division of ATS Andlauer Transportation Services (ATS). The division focuses on the retail and supply chain sectors and was renamed TForce Integrated Solutions on January 1, 2014.

Speedy focused on the US market and was merged with TransForce's prior US-based energy services acquisition, Hemphill Trucking, to form Hemphill-Speedy.

US and further Canadian expansion 

Dynamex would be renamed TForce Logistics. Additional parcel expansion came in June 2011 when TransForce acquired the domestic Canadian business of DHL Express. The division would be operated as Loomis Express and continued to focus on domestic services while offering international services via an alliance with DHL Express.

TransForce once again reorganized its energy services holdings in 2012 by consolidating its Canadian subsidiaries Kos Oilfield Transportation and Howard's Transport with their US counterparts Hemphill-Speedy and I.E. Miller to form TForce Energy Services.

A months long campaign by TransForce to acquire one of its largest rivals, Canadian truckload carrier Contrans Group Inc., and its subsidiaries for  completed successfully on January 15, 2015. Contrans comprised 12 trucking companies primarily in the truckload and specialty truckload markets. Earlier in the year, Contrans as a whole was reported to have operated 1,493 tractors, 2,541 trailers, and 39 straight trucks. The same report showed TransForce with 3,774 tractors, 12,486 trailers, and 3,288 straight trucks across all divisions. Most Contrans subsidiaries continued to operate as TransForce subsidiaries following acquisition.

By 2016, TransForce already had a large LTL presence in the US via a variety of acquisitions but their truckload market share increased significantly with the October purchase of XPO Logistics Truckload, the truckload division of US freight carrier and broker XPO Logistics. The purchase price was reported to be . XPO had purchased US carrier Con-Way the previous year but didn't find its truckload division, Con-Way Truckload, to be a good fit for XPO's strategic direction. There was a clause in the contract when Con-Way Freight bought Contract Freighters INC. The contract stated that if Con-Way were to ever sell their company that the former owners of Contract Freighters Inc had the right to buy it back. So a deal was struck with TransForce for a better fit.

TransForce renamed the division CFI, the original name of the company acquired by Con-Way which had been rebranded Con-Way Truckload.

In December 2016 the company changed its name to TFI International in a move it said "better reflects the increased geographic scope of its operations." This "increased geographic scope" was illustrated by the company's 2016 reports which showed 53% of its business was in Canada and 47% was in the US.

DLS was renamed TForce Worldwide (later renamed again TFWW) and continued to operate from the former DLS headquarters in Bolingbrook, Illinois.

UPS Freight acquisition 

At the time, the acquisition was the second largest deal in North American trucking history after the 2017 merger of Swift Transportation and Knight Transportation and made TFI one of the largest trucking companies in North America.

In the purchase UPS expected to find synergies between the LTL services of Overnite and UPS' core package services. The move was also a bid to head off rival FedEx which had recently expanded into LTL via a series of acquisitions. However, for UPS the expected synergies did not materialize to the extent expected and the company decided to sell off its freight business and refocus on small package services.

The division's core LTL services were rebranded TForce Freight and would continue to operate out of the carrier's Richmond, Virginia headquarters. The smaller truckload business, representing about 10% of revenues, would be transferred to TFI's other US truckload companies. TFI announced plans to invest  to  into the new division for fleet upgrades including replacing about 1,000 trucks as well as price renegotiations with customers.

Operations

Financial performance

Corporate Management 
Since the late 1990s, TFI has been led by chairman, president, & CEO Alain Bédard. Notable members of the TFI board include former president, CEO, and chairman of the National Bank of Canada André Bérard, former founder and president of CF Montréal Joey Saputo, and former journalist and National Assembly of Quebec member Richard Guay. From 2007 to August 2021 Lucien Bouchard was a member of TFI's board. Bouchard had held a number of senior political positions in Canada including Secretary of State, Premier of Quebec, and Ambassador to France.

Business segments 

TFI organizes its divisions and subsidiaries into four business segments.

Package and courier 

The company owns four subsidiaries which together form its package and courier segment. These are:

Less-than-truckload 

There are several divisions/subsidiaries in TFI's less-than-truckload (LTL) segment. These are a mix of road and intermodal providers. Notable subsidiaries include:

Truckload 

The Truckload segment consists of 43 divisions/subsidiaries providing truckload shipping services. In addition to standard dry van services, subsidiaries also provide specialized truckload services such as flatbed, tank, and intermodal transportation. Notable subsidiaries in this segment include:

Logistics 

TFI's Logistics segment is composed of 21 divisions/subsidiaries which provide logistics and transportation management services. Most divisions and subsidiaries primarily handle general freight but some are specialized around certain industries such as chemical transportation and medical logistics. Notable subsidiaries in this segment include:

Acquisitions 
Since 1997, TFI's primary growth strategy has been through acquisitions having acquired over 180 companies between 1996 and 2020. These include a number of major transportation-related investments and dozens of "tuck-in" acquisitions intended to complement existing operations. TFI gives most subsidiaries (which are largely former independent companies) a certain level of autonomy.  That allows each subsidiary to continue to cater to different regional markets and segments as a specialized interest.  TFI International then uses its influence and cash flow to help increase the capacity of each subsidiary (like it did in 2010 when its purchase of a 52-door cross dock terminal in Calgary tripled the capacity of TST Overland and expanded its shipping network).

Controversies 

In August 2020, TFI's four Canadian courier subsidiaries, Canpar Express, ICS Courier, Loomis Express and TForce Integrated Solutions, were the victims of ransomware attacks. All four company websites were taken down by TFI for some time but TFI stated no customer data had been obtained by hackers. Subsequently, three internal documents from Canpar Express were leaked to the dark web. The source of the leak appeared to be hacking group DoppelPaymer. Following the attack, some Canpar customers reported shipping delays.

References

External links 
 
 Official website

Companies listed on the Toronto Stock Exchange
Companies listed on the New York Stock Exchange
Logistics companies of Canada
Companies based in Montreal
Saint-Laurent, Quebec
Transport companies established in 1957
Canadian companies established in 1957
1957 establishments in Quebec